LHS 288 (Luyten 143-23) is a red dwarf around 15.8 light years from the Sun, the closest in the constellation Carina (near Eta Carinae). It is far too faint to be seen with the unaided eye, with an apparent magnitude of 13.92.

Recent studies suggest it may harbour a planet with a mass as small as 2.4 , but the possibility that it passed over an undetected faint star could not be eliminated.

See also
 List of nearest stars

References

 calculated using this formula

External links
 Knowing Our Neighbors: Fundamental Properties of Nearby Stars by Jennifer Bartlett
 SIMBAD astronomical database on LHS 288

Carina (constellation)
3618
Local Bubble
M-type main-sequence stars